is a municipality in the county of Vestland, Norway. It is located in the traditional district of Nordhordland. The administrative centre is the village of Dalekvam. Other villages in Vaksdal include Dalegarden, Flatkvål, Helle, Nesheim, Stamneshella, Stanghelle, and Vaksdal.

The  municipality is the 160th largest by area out of the 356 municipalities in Norway. Vaksdal is the 205th most populous municipality in Norway with a population of 3,867.

In 2016, the chief of police for Vestlandet formally suggested a reconfiguration of police districts and stations. He proposed that the police station in Solund be closed.

General information

The municipality of Vaksdal was created on 1 January 1964 after a major municipal restructuring after the Schei Committee's recommendations. Vaksdal was formed from the following places:
 All of Bruvik municipality, except for the Bruvikbygda area on Osterøy island (population: 5,264)
 The Bergsdalen and Eksingedalen valleys from the municipality of Evanger (population: 251)
 The rest of the Eksingedalen valley that was located in the municipality of Modalen (population: 151)

Name
The municipality was named after the village of Vaksdal, one of the main villages in the municipality. The Old Norse form of the name was probably Vágsdalr. The first element is the genitive case of vágr which means "bay" and the last element is dalr which means "valley" or "dale". Alternately, the first part of the name could be derived from a local river name spelled Vaxa or Veksa which would mean the valley of the river Vaxa/Veksa.

Coat of arms
The coat of arms was granted on 16 November 1990. It shows three black shuttles for weaving on a yellow background. The shuttles were chosen to represent the textile industry of the municipality. The Dale of Norway company is based here and it is an international company renowned for its wool sweaters.

Churches
The Church of Norway has six parishes within the municipality of Vaksdal. It is part of the Hardanger og Voss prosti (deanery) in the Diocese of Bjørgvin.

Geography

The municipality is mountainous, and stretches along both sides of the Veafjorden with adjacent valleys. It includes part of the island Osterøy. The Kallestadsundet Bridge connects the mainland of Vaksdal to the island of Osterøy. In the north, it includes the valleys of Eksingedalen and Bergsdalen, with its borders extending into the mountains. Major lakes in the municipality include Askjelldalsvatnet and Skjerjavatnet.

The main centers of population are Dale (pop. 1174), Vaksdal (pop. 957), and Stanghelle (pop. 767).  Dale and Vaksdal are industrial villages that arose around factories utilising the hydro-electric power resources provided by the mountainous terrain and rainy climate. The Bergensbanen railway line between Norway's two largest cities Oslo and Bergen, and the main road between the same two cities, European route E16, run through Vaksdal municipality. The Bergensbanen railway line has the following stations in Vaksdal: Bogegrend Station, Dale Station, Stanghelle Station, and Vaksdal Station

History

Vaksdal was created as a new municipality on 1 January 1964 after the merger of parts of Bruvik, Evanger, and Modalen municipalities.

During the German invasion of Norway during World War II, from 19 April to 24 April, there was heavy fighting within the borders of the present municipality, with German forces advancing along the railway line from Bergen towards Voss. The heaviest fighting was for the village of Vaksdal itself, from 19 to 23 April. Further fighting took place at Stanghelle and Dalseid on 23 and 24 April. Three Norwegian soldiers and one civilian, and a larger, but unknown, number of German soldiers fell in Vaksdal.

Government
All municipalities in Norway, including Vaksdal, are responsible for primary education (through 10th grade), outpatient health services, senior citizen services, unemployment and other social services, zoning, economic development, and municipal roads. The municipality is governed by a municipal council of elected representatives, which in turn elect a mayor.  The municipality falls under the Hordaland District Court and the Gulating Court of Appeal.

Municipal council
The municipal council of Vaksdal is made up of 21 representatives that are elected to four year terms. The party breakdown of the council is as follows:

Mayor
The mayors of Vaksdal (incomplete list):
2007–present: Eirik Haga (Ap)
1999-2007: Øivind Olsnes (H)

Notable people 
 Harald Langhelle (1890 in Dale – executed 1942) a newspaper editor, politician and Norwegian resistance member
 Bjørn Wiik (1937 in Bruvik - 1999) a Norwegian elementary particle physicist
 Sjur Olsnes (1939–2014) a Norwegian biochemist and academic, grew up in Vaksdal
 Helén Eriksen (born 1971 in Dale) a jazz musician, (saxophone and vocals), songwriter and music arranger
 Frida Amundsen (born 1992 in Vaksdal) a Norwegian singer and songwriter

References

External links

Municipal fact sheet from Statistics Norway 

 
Municipalities of Vestland
1964 establishments in Norway